Allison Stone or Alison Stone may refer to:

Allison, Stone, an unincorporated community in Stone County, Arkansas
Allison & Stone, an American musical duo
Alison Stone, British philosopher
Alison Stone (poet), American poet
Allison Stone, a character in 2014 film Into the Storm